Baugur may refer to:
 Baugur (crater), a volcanic crater in Iceland
 Baugur Group, a former Icelandic investment company